East Columbia is an Unincorporated community in Brazoria County, Texas, United States.  It is located nine miles west from Angleton.  It was one of the most important inland ports in Texas.  The river port became a vital component in the plantation-based economy that developed along the Brazos River in the 19th century. The community was founded in 1824 by Josiah Hughes Bell. A native of South Carolina, Bell came to Texas with Stephen F. Austin's Old 300 colony in 1821.  Bell built a landing of log-lines docks and timbered stops on the Brazos River just below Varner's Creek.  Bell laid out the town and called it Marion.  Bell sold the townsite to Walter C. White in 1827.  By the mid-1800s the town had a population of 800. The arrival of the railroad in the area led to the decline of steamboat traffic which had an adverse effect on the town's fortunes.  Storms in 1900, 1909, and 1913 were destructive to the community.  When oil was discovered in West Columbia in 1918, merchants abandoned East Columbia.  By the 1970s the town's post office had already closed and its population had decreased substantially.

Education
Columbia-Brazoria Independent School District operates schools in the area.

The Texas Legislature assigned the area in Columbia-Brazoria ISD (including West Columbia) to the Brazosport College district.

Photo gallery

References

External links

Unincorporated communities in Brazoria County, Texas
Unincorporated communities in Texas